Kellough is a surname. Notable people with the surname include:

Doc Kellough (died  1956–57), Canadian ice hockey player
Kaie Kellough (born 1975), Canadian poet and writer